Red tape is an idiom referring to regulations or conformity to formal rules or standards which are claimed to be excessive, rigid or redundant, or to bureaucracy claimed to hinder or prevent action or decision-making. It is usually applied to governments, corporations, and other large organizations. Things often described as "red tape" include filling out paperwork, obtaining licenses, having multiple people or committees approve a decision and various low-level rules that make conducting one's affairs slower, more difficult, or both. Red tape has been found to hamper organizational performance and employee wellbeing by meta-analytic studies in 2020. A related concept, administrative burden, refers to the costs citizens may experience in their interaction with government even if bureaucratic regulations or procedures serve legitimate purposes.

Origins

It is generally believed that the term originated with the Spanish administration of Charles V, King of Spain and Holy Roman Emperor, in the early 16th century, who started to use red tape in an effort to modernize the administration that was running his vast empire. The red tape was used to bind the most important administrative dossiers that required immediate discussion by the Council of State, and separate them from issues that were treated in an ordinary administrative way, which were bound with ordinary string.

Although they were not governing such a vast territory as Charles V, this practice of using red tape to separate the important dossiers that had to be discussed was quickly copied by the other modern European monarchs to speed up their administrative machines.

Later history 
The tradition continued through to the 17th and 18th century. In David Copperfield, Charles Dickens wrote, "Britannia, that unfortunate female, is always before me, like a trussed fowl: skewered through and through with office-pens, and bound hand and foot with red tape." The English practice of binding documents and official papers with red tape was popularized in Thomas Carlyle's writings, protesting against official inertia with expressions like "Little other than a red tape Talking-machine, and unhappy Bag of Parliamentary Eloquence". To this day, most defense barristers' briefs, and those from private clients, are tied in a pink-coloured ribbon known as "pink tape" or "legal tape".

20th–21st century 
In the late 20th century and continuing into the 21st century, with civil servants using computers and information technology, a legacy from the administration of the Spanish Empire can still be observed where some parts of the higher levels of the Spanish administration continue the tradition of using red tape to bind important dossiers that need to be discussed and to keep them bound in red tape when the dossier is closed. This is, for example, the case for the Spanish Council of State, the supreme consultative council of the Spanish Government. In contrast, the lower Spanish courts use ordinary twine to bundle documents as their cases are not supposed to be heard at higher levels. The Spanish Government plans to phase out the use of paper and abandon the practice of using twine.

As of the early 21st century, Spanish bureaucracy continues to be notorious for unusually extreme levels of red tape (in the figurative sense). As of 2013, the World Bank ranked Spain 136 out of 185 countries for ease of starting a business, which took on average 10 procedures and 28 days. 

Similar issues persist throughout Latin America. For example, Mexico was the original home of Syntex, one of the greatest pharmaceutical firms of the 20th century—but in 1959, the company left for the American city of Palo Alto, California (in what is now Silicon Valley) because its scientists were fed up with the Mexican government's bureaucratic delays which repeatedly impeded their research. As of 2009 in Mexico, it took six months and a dozen visits to government agencies to obtain a permit to paint a house, and to obtain a monthly prescription for gamma globulin for X-linked agammaglobulinemia a patient had to obtain signatures from two government doctors and stamps from four separate bureaucrats before presenting the prescription to a dispensary.

In the United States, cutting red tape was a central principle of a 1993 National Performance Review study requested by the Clinton Administration.

Red tape reduction
The expression "cutting of red tape" generally refers to a reduction of bureaucratic obstacles to action. Public administration scholars have studied the impact of red tape on public servants through research on administrative performance, behavioral impact, and rule quality. 

Business representatives often claim red tape is a barrier to business, particularly small business. In Canada, the Canadian Federation of Independent Business has done extensive research into the impact of red tape on small businesses. ’As of 2018, small businesses were subject to 15,875 regulatory requirements from Health Canada, 1,808 from the Canada Revenue Agency and 4,519 from Finance Canada. According to data compiled by the federal government, a total of 136,121 federal requirements were imposed on businesses, in addition to provincial requirements. The Canadian government’s One-for-One rule recommends that regulators offset new costs in the two years following the implementation of new regulation. From 2012 to 2018, 131 individual regulations were eliminated by Ottawa, reducing the administrative burden by $30.6 million. However, during that same time period, 76 new regulations were exempted from the One-for-One rule. 

The European Commission has a competition that offers an award for the "Best Idea for Red Tape Reduction". The competition is "aimed at identifying innovative suggestions for reducing unnecessary bureaucracy stemming from European law". In 2008, the European Commission held a conference entitled 'Cutting Red Tape for Europe'. The goal of the conference was "reducing red tape and overbearing bureaucracy," in order to help "business people and entrepreneurs improve competitiveness".

Beyond actual reductions to red tape, some evidence suggests that applying rules consistently and fairly can positively affect the extent to which citizens perceive that red tape exists in a government agency.

Administrative burden
"Administrative burden" is a related concept to "red tape." Whereas red tape suggests that regulations do not serve legitimate purposes, the concept of administrative burden recognizes that regulations that are intended for good purposes may nonetheless entail a burden. Administrative burden can be defined as "the learning, psychological, and compliance costs that citizens experience in their interactions with government." Sometimes these costs are seen as legitimate or necessary if they achieve important public values without creating too onerous a burden for citizens.

However, administrative burden can exacerbate inequality when it is not evenly distributed or when it affects people differently. For example, the Khawaja Sira in Pakistan -- individuals who are "culturally identified as neither men nor women" -- face psychological costs of discrimination and unusually high compliance costs when they attempt to obtain legal IDs. Historically exploited or marginalized individuals might choose not to seek out benefits for which they are eligible, drop out of government programs, or have negative interactions with bureaucrats as a result of unequal administrative burdens. Depending on the benefit area and the level of burden experienced, these consequences could have negative effects on individuals' health, employment, and wellbeing. Existing societal inequalities also increase the likelihood that vulnerable individuals experience administrative burdens in the first place based on their identity and the benefits they are seeking (e.g., maternity leave or childcare benefits). There is some evidence that perceptions of deservingness might influence politicians' willingness to either passively allow administrative burdens or actively create them through policy design; this theory has equity implications if members of marginalized groups are seen as less deserving.

See also

 Busy work
 Crony capitalism
 Cronyism
 Instruction creep
 Micromanagement
 Paperwork Reduction Act
 Paternalism
 Prig
 Purple crocodile
 Sir Humphrey Appleby

References

Further reading
George et al. (2020) Red Tape, Organizational Performance and Employee Outcomes: Meta-Analysis, Meta-Regression and Research Agenda. Public Administration Review.
Barry Bozeman (2000) Bureaucracy and Red Tape Prentice-Hall Publishing.

OECD (2006) 'Cutting red tape; national strategies for administrative simplification' OECD Editions, Paris.

Slang
Organizational theory
Public choice theory
Metaphors referring to objects
Bureaucratic organization
Waste of resources